Alaxançallı (also, Alakhanchally and Karakullar-Alakhanchally) is a village and municipality in the Dashkasan Rayon of Azerbaijan.  It has a population of 586.

References 

Populated places in Dashkasan District